The Kherson Oblast Council is the regional oblast council (parliament) of the Kherson Oblast (province) located in Southern Ukraine.

Council members are elected for five year terms. In order to gain representation in the council, a party must gain more than 5 percent of the total vote.

During the Russian takeover and occupation of the oblast, the activities of the Council were temporarily suspended. A collaborationist entity called Salvation Committee for Peace and Order began to operate in its place. Activities of the Council resumed in November 2022.

Recent elections

2020
Distribution of seats after the 2020 Ukrainian local elections
 
Election date was 25 October 2020

Note: On 20 March 2022 the faction of the Volodymyr Saldo Bloc ceased to exist. Its deputies joined the newly formed faction "Support to the programs of the President of Ukraine".

2015
Distribution of seats after the 2015 Ukrainian local elections

Election date was 25 October 2015

References

Council
Regional legislatures of Ukraine
Unicameral legislatures